Carl Heinrich Christian Ludwig Rumpff (born 30 April 1839, died 2 June 1889) was a German business executive and philanthropist, who served as the first Chairman of Bayer. He was the son-in-law of Friedrich Bayer, the company's founder, following his 1871 marriage to Clara Bayer. From 1872 he was also a co-owner of the company.

Rumpff was a collector of minerals. His collection included items purchased from Archduke Stephan. After his death, his collection was donated to the Natural History Museum, Berlin.

References

German businesspeople in the healthcare industry
1839 births
1889 deaths
Bayer family